Mojtaba Heidarpour (born 20 September 1988) is an Iranian handball player for Samen Sabzevar and the Iranian national team.

References

1988 births
Living people
Iranian male handball players
Handball players at the 2018 Asian Games
Asian Games competitors for Iran
21st-century Iranian people